The 13th Pan American Games were held in Winnipeg, Manitoba, Canada from July 23 to August 8, 1999.

Medals

Gold

Men's Kumite (– 75 kg): Ricardo Pérez
Women's Kumite (– 60 kg): María Wayow

Silver

Women's Singles: Alicia Marcano

Men's Bantamweight (– 54 kg): Nehomar Cermeno

Men's Kata: Antonio Díaz
Men's Kumite (– 70 kg): Jaime Noguera

Bronze

Men's Lightweight (– 60 kg): Patrick López
Men's Welterweight (– 67 kg): Charlie Navarro
Men's Middleweight (– 75 kg): Jim Rodriguez

Men's Kumite (– 60 kg): Eduardo Noguera
Men's Kumite (– 70 kg): Jean Carlos Peña
Women's Kata: Ana Martínez

See also
 Venezuela at the 2000 Summer Olympics

Nations at the 1999 Pan American Games
P
1999